Sceloporus samcolemani, also known commonly as Coleman's bunchgrass lizard, Coleman's bunch grass lizard, and lagartija de Coleman in Spanish, is a species of lizard in the family Phrynosomatidae. The species is endemic to Mexico.

Etymology
The specific name, samcolemani, is in honor of Sam Coleman who aided Hobart Smith in his research by writing data-processing programs.

Geographic range
S. samcolemani is found in northern Sierra Madre Oriental of the states of Coahuila and Nuevo León.

Habitat

Reproduction
S. samcolemani is oviparous.

References

Further reading
Smith HM, Hall WP (1974). "Contributions to the concepts of reproductive cycles and the systematics of the scalaris group of the lizard genus Sceloporus". Great Basin Naturalist 34 (2): 97–104. (Sceloporus scalaris samcolemanii, new subspecies).
Watkins-Colewell GJ, Smith HM, Liner EA, Chiszar D (1998). "Sceloporus samcolemani Smith and Hall, Coleman's Bunch Grass Lizard". Catalogue of American Amphibians and Reptiles 675: 1–2. (Sceloporus samcolemani, new status).

Sceloporus
Fauna of the Sierra Madre Oriental
Endemic reptiles of Mexico
Reptiles described in 1974
Taxa named by Hobart Muir Smith